The 1999 United Kingdom Budget, officially known as Budget 99: Building a Stronger Economic Future for Britain was the formal government budget for the year 1999.

Background 
The budget took place during a period of continuing economic expansion, shortly after the launch of the Euro currency on 1 January 1999, and at the tail end of the dot-com bubble.

During 1998, net public sector debt stood at £361.2 billion, 35.6 per cent of GDP.

Interest rates had declined rapidly over the previous twelve months from a peak of 7.5 per cent in June 1998 to 5.5 per cent by February 1999, whilst inflation during 1998 was recorded at 1.6 per cent (CPI) and 3.4 per cent (RPI).

Budget measures 
A new starting rate of income tax at 10 per cent was to be introduced in April 1999. Basic rate income tax was to be reduced from 23 per cent to 22 per cent in April 2000. The budget also abolished the married couple's allowance for under-65s and MIRAS mortgage interest relief from April 2000. Child tax credit was to be introduced and employer national insurance contributions cut by 0.5 per cent from April 2001. Stamp duties on property were to be raised. A Climate Change Levy was scheduled for the 2001-02 fiscal year.

Details

Tax Revenue

Spending

References 

Budget
United Kingdom budgets
United Kingdom budget
March 1999 events in the United Kingdom
Gordon Brown